Małgorzata Bożena Guzowska-Nowak (born February 9, 1959 in Białystok, Podlaskie) is a retired Polish heptathlete.

Biography
She twice won the gold medal at the Summer Universiade during her career. Guzowska set her personal best (4459 points) in the pentathlon in 1980. Her best of 6616 points in the heptathlon remained the Polish national record for the event until 2022.

She represented her country at the 1980 Summer Olympics and was twelfth in the women's pentathlon. At the 1982 European Athletics Championships, she came twelfth. She was fourth in the heptathlon at the 1984 Friendship Games. In 1986 she won the Décastar heptathlon title and came sixth at the 1986 European Athletics Championships.

At national level, she won five straight heptathlon titles from 1980 to 1984 and also won the 100 metres hurdles title in 1986. At the indoor Polish championships, she was a four-time pentathlon champion as well as having a shot put title and two wins in the 60 metres hurdles.

Achievements

References

External links
 

1959 births
Living people
Polish pentathletes
Polish heptathletes
Athletes (track and field) at the 1980 Summer Olympics
Olympic athletes of Poland
Sportspeople from Białystok
Universiade medalists in athletics (track and field)
Universiade gold medalists for Poland
Medalists at the 1981 Summer Universiade
20th-century Polish women
21st-century Polish women